Archaeoglobus profundus is a sulphate-reducing archaea. Archaeoglobus can be found in high-temperature oil fields where it may contribute to oil field souring. A. profundus grows lithotrophically, and while it needs acetate and CO2 for biosynthesis it is heterotrophic.

References

Further reading

Scientific databases

External links

Type strain of Archaeoglobus profundus at BacDive -  the Bacterial Diversity Metadatabase

Euryarchaeota
Archaea described in 1990